The British Virgin Islands requires its residents to register their motor vehicles and display vehicle registration plates. Many plates have 'Virgin Islands' and 'Nature's Little Secrets' above and below the sequence respectively.  Before 1996, European standard 520 mm × 110 mm sizes and British stamping dies were used, but current plates are North American standard 6 × 12 inches (152 × 300 mm) as used in the US Virgin Islands.

See also 
 Vehicle registration plates of British overseas territories

References

External links

British Virgin Islands
Transport in the British Virgin Islands
British Virgin Islands-related lists